James Ferry is a priest of the Anglican Church of Canada.  In 1992 he was removed from his parish after it was revealed that he was gay and in a relationship with another man.

Raised in the United Church of Canada, later a member of a Baptist congregation, Ferry joined the Anglican Church in his twenties. He studied at the University of Toronto at Scarborough, Tyndale University College (then Ontario Bible College) and Wycliffe College.

He was inhibited from functioning as a priest and later became affiliated with the Metropolitan Community Church, a gay and lesbian founded church which has taken an explicitly gay-affirming stance including the ordination of openly gay candidates for the ministry. He was later partially reinstated as an Anglican priest and now occasionally celebrates the Eucharist and preaches at the Church of the Holy Trinity, Toronto.

Ferry published a book about his experience, In the Courts of the Lord, in 1994.

In 2006 Archbishop Terence Finlay, who had inhibited Ferry, married a lesbian couple in a United Church of Canada church, prompting Ferry to publicly demand an apology for Finlay's treatment of him.

Finlay's successor, Archbishop Colin Johnson, reinstated Ferry's licence on 26 June  2011 and appointed him an honorary assistant priest at the Church of the Holy Trinity.

References

Living people
Canadian LGBT rights activists
Canadian Anglican priests
LGBT Anglican clergy
University of Toronto alumni
Canadian gay writers
Canadian memoirists
Year of birth missing (living people)